Atlantis Paradise Island is an ocean-themed resort on Paradise Island in the Bahamas. It is built around Aquaventure, a  waterscape.

Property history 
The property was originally part of the Paradise Island Hotel and Casino, which opened in 1968. It was owned by Resorts International, a Merv Griffin company. Previously, Donald Trump owned a majority stake in Resorts International, spinning off ownership of the Trump Taj Mahal property from the company and selling Resorts International in full, including outstanding debts from the Taj Mahal construction, to Griffin. Paradise Island was purchased by South African hotel magnate Sol Kerzner and Kerzner International Limited in 1994, and Kerzner's new resort, consisting of the Coral Towers and the previously built The Beach Tower, opened officially on December 11, 1998. The property's name was changed to Atlantis when The Royal Towers was built. The Coral Towers and The Beach Tower were later refurbished to match the theme of the Royal Towers. On March 28, 2007, a 600-suite luxury hotel named The Cove Atlantis opened on Paradise Island. Another tower, the 497-room The Reef, opened on December 19, 2007.

As of July 2014, the property is owned and operated by Brookfield Hospitality. In October 2014, Atlantis, Paradise Island became a member of Marriott Bonvoy, a loyalty program for guests to earn or redeem Marriott Bonvoy points at Atlantis.

Design and construction
The resort has multiple attractions including water rides, slides, artificial waves and tides. In addition, Atlantis is home to 14 lagoons and more than 50,000 aquatic animals representing over 250 marine species. In addition, the resort has a Golf course. It is a private 18-hole, par 72 championship golf course that stretches for over 7,100 yards. The course features a restaurant and bar located at the clubhouse. Many professional golf events are hosted at the Ocean Club Golf including the LPGA Pure Silk Bahamas Classic. The resort features a marina designed to dock large yachts. 

The resort hosts a  marine habitat for rescued bottlenose dolphins, sea lions and manta rays.

See also
Atlantis The Palm, Dubai
Atlantis Resorts

References

External links 

Casinos completed in 1998
Hotel buildings completed in 1998
Casinos in the Bahamas
Resorts in the Bahamas
Autograph Collection Hotels
Hotels in the Bahamas
1998 establishments in the Bahamas